The 2011–12 1. FC Kaiserslautern season was the 112th season in club history.

Season summary
Kaiserlautern finished the season in 18th place, and were relegated. Manager Marco Kurz had been sacked in March and replaced by Bulgarian Krasimir Balakov as a last roll of the dice, but to no avail. Balakov was sacked himself and replaced by former Sturm Graz manager Franco Foda.

Players

First-team squad
Squad at end of season

Left club during season

Competitions

Bundesliga

League table

References

Notes

External links

Kaiserslautern
1. FC Kaiserslautern seasons